The Church of the Intercession of the Blessed Virgin Mary ― is a Russian Orthodox church in Kamensk-Shakhtinsky, Rostov Oblast, Russia. It belongs to Kamenskoe deanery of Shakhty and Millerovo Diocese of Moscow Patriarchate.

History 
The Church of the Intercession in Kamensk-Shakhtinsky city was laid on October 14, 1991, on the day of the feast of Intercession of the Holy Virgin. Yet its construction works began only five years after, in 1996 and were conducted on donations made by city residents. It was built on the project of architect G. D. Starykh. The church bell-tower has six bells ― five bells are placed in a small belfry, and the main bell that weighs 350 kg and is about a meter in diameter. All of them were cast in Voronezh.

The church, opened on October 14, 2003, has a Sunday school, a parish library, and a canteen for homeless people. Church clergy members and some of the parishioners volunteer at the town hospital, orphanage and high school situated nearby.

Notes

References 

Churches in Rostov Oblast
Churches completed in 2003
Russian Orthodox church buildings in Russia